The discography of A1, British/Norwegian boy band.
Their first single, "Be the First to Believe", entered the UK singles chart at No. 6 in early 1999. They had relative success in the charts with two number #1s and six other top 10 hits. Adding to this they also won a BRIT Award for "British Breakthrough Act" in 2001. A1's journey came to an end when original member Paul Marazzi left in 2002 and the band subsequently decided to split. In August 2009 it was announced that the group would reform, albeit without Marazzi, in Norway for a series of concerts in Oslo in December 2009 at the Christiania Theatre.

Albums

Studio albums

Compilation albums

Singles

References

Discographies of British artists
Discographies of Norwegian artists
Pop music group discographies
Discography